João Vitor Vallony da Silva (born 7 February 2001), commonly known as Da Silva, is a Brazilian professional footballer who plays as a central defender for Goiás.

Club career
Born in Goiânia, Da Silva was a Goiás youth graduate. He made his first team debut on 28 January 2021, starting in a 3–2 Campeonato Goiano away win over Goianésia.

On 28 May 2021, Da Silva was loaned to Aparecidense for the remainder of the year. He struggled with injuries during his spell, and returned to his parent club without making an appearance.

Upon returning, Da Silva appeared sparingly in the 2022 Campeonato Goiano, scoring his first senior goal on 20 February in a 3–0 away success over Jataiense. On 6 April 2022, he renewed his contract until 2024.

Da Silva made his Série A debut on 10 April 2022, starting in a 0–3 away loss against Coritiba.

Career statistics

References

External links
 Futebol de Goyaz profile 

2001 births
Living people
Sportspeople from Goiânia
Brazilian footballers
Association football defenders
Campeonato Brasileiro Série A players
Goiás Esporte Clube players
Associação Atlética Aparecidense players